Sweyn is a Scandinavian masculine given name which may refer to:

Kings:
 Sweyn Forkbeard (960–1014), King of Denmark, England, and Norway as Sweyn I
 Sweyn or Svein Knutsson (c. 1016–1035), King of Norway as Sweyn II
 Sweyn II of Denmark (1019–1076), King of Denmark
 Blot-Sweyn or Sweyn the Sacrificer (died 1087), pagan King of Sweden
 Sweyn III of Denmark (1125–1157), King of Denmark

Others:
 Sweyn Haakonsson (died c. 1016), an earl and co-ruler of Norway from 1000 to c. 1015
 Sweyn Godwinson (c. 1020–1052), Earl of Herefordshire, brother of Harold Godwinson, last Anglo-Saxon king of England
 Sweyn the Crusader (c. 1050-1097), Danish participant in the First Crusade, son of Sweyn II of Denmark
 Sweyn Asleifsson (c. 1115–1171), a Viking who appears in the Orkneyinga Saga

See also
 Sven
 Svein
 Sveinn
 Svend
 Swen

Scandinavian masculine given names